Zeta Cephei (ζ Cep, ζ Cephei) is a star in the constellation of Cepheus. Zeta Cephei marks the left shoulder of Cepheus, the King of Joppa (Ethiopia).  It is one of the fundamental stars of the MK spectral sequence, defined as type K1.5 Ib.

Zeta Cephei is an orange supergiant star with a surface temperature of 3,853 K and eight times more massive than the Sun. The luminosity of Zeta Cephei is approximately 3,600 times that of the Sun. At a distance of about 840 light-years, Zeta Cephei has an apparent magnitude (m) of 3.4 and an absolute magnitude (M) of -4.7. The star has a metallicity approximately 1.6 times that of the Sun; i.e., it contains 1.6 times as much heavy-element material as the Sun.

Hekker et al. (2008) have detected a periodicity of 533 days, hinting at the possible presence of an as yet unseen companion.  It is listed as a possible eclipsing binary with a very small amplitude.

At the edge of the 8 to 10 solar mass limit at which stars develop iron cores and then explode as supernovae, Zeta Cephei's most likely fate is to produce a very massive white dwarf near the Chandrasekhar limit (1.4 ) at which such dense remnants can survive. If Zeta Cephei is a binary star; i.e., if there is a stellar companion, and it is close enough to feed sufficient matter to the white-dwarf-to-be, it is marginally possible that the limit could be overflowed, resulting in the white dwarf's collapse and a Type Ia supernova explosion.

References

Cepheus (constellation)
Cephei, Zeta
Cephei, 21
210745
105199
8465
K-type supergiants
Durchmusterung objects